Indian Genetic Disease Database (IGDD) is the first patient-based genetic disease database in India. It is developed and maintained at Indian Institute of Chemical Biology (IICB), a unit of the Council of Scientific and Industrial Research.

The first version of the database was published online. It is divided into 19 disease categories, including Blood Related Disorders, Bone and Joints Related Growth Disorders, Eye Disorders, Gastro-Intestinal Disorders, Hearing Disorders, Lysosomal Disorders, Multi-system Disorders, Muscle Related Disorders, Neurological Disorders, Pigmentary Disorders, and Skin Related Disorders.

This database keeps track of mutations in the causal genes for that genetic diseases common in India. The database will be helpful to physicians, geneticists, researchers, and other professionals in India and abroad related to genetic disorders to retrieve and use the information for the benefit of mankind.

Features

The database was launched in August 2010. It holds patient-based data with respect to the geographical location, age, sex, and ethnic group. Disease incidence can be compared with other regions. The mode of inheritance of a particular disease is also recorded..

Each disease is represented with gene name, chromosome location, mutations, and geospatial distribution.

The first version of the database covered 52 diseases with information on 5,760 individuals. It later expanded to 109 genetic diseases.

Achievements
The Publication was selected as a featured article in Nucleic Acid Research in 2011.

Submission 

Patient-specific mutation information can be entered online.

References

External links
Indian Genetic Disease Database Website

Genetic diseases and disorders
Biological databases
Databases in India
Diseases and disorders in India
Medical databases